is a Japanese publisher of mystery fiction, science fiction, fantasy, literary fiction and social science, based in Tokyo.

History
In 1925, a publisher called  of Osaka was established with a branch in Tokyo.

In 1948, the Tokyo branch of Sogensha spun off into a separate company with the same name, Sogensha.

In 1954, Sogensha (Tokyo) was officially reorganized into Tokyo Sogensha Co., Ltd.

Between 1962 and 1970, Tokyo Sogensha changed its name to  due to its reconstruction from bankruptcy.

Both Tokyo Sogensha Co., Ltd. and Sogensha Inc. exist as unrelated publishing companies.

In 2013, the official mascot cat named Kurari was released. Kurari's name is from Japanese kanji   of Sogensha.  can be divided to kanji  and katakana .

Imprints
  Started in 1959. It is one of the leading Bunkobon (small-format paperback) labels focusing on mystery, science fiction, fantasy, and horror. The label had specialized in translation until 1984 then the company started publishing Japanese works.
  See below.
  Started in 1995
 Magazines
  1992-2000
  2001-2003
  2003-2021
  2021-

Mystery

Science Fiction
As a science fiction publisher, Tokyo Sogensha began with the translation of Fredric Brown's works as a division of Sōgen Suiri Bunko in 1963. It published 677 books as of 2015 including the works of Arthur C. Clarke, Isaac Asimov, Robert A. Heinlein, Ray Bradbury, J. G. Ballard, Philip K. Dick, Lois McMaster Bujold, Vernor Vinge, James P. Hogan, Kim Stanley Robinson, Robert Charles Wilson, and Greg Egan. It scored early success in the post-war period with the Barsoom books of Edgar Rice Burroughs and the words of E. E. Smith.

Sogen SF Bunko had specialized in translation until 2007 then it started publishing Japanese works. The first Japanese titles were reprints of Legend of Galactic Heroes #1 by Yoshiki Tanaka and Babylonia Wave by Akira Hori.

Recognition
Tokyo Sogensha won the Seiun Award for Best Translated Long Work for 18 works out of 52 times (as of 2021); the Nihon SF Taisho Award in 2012, 2013 and 2019 for Japanese Works.

Horror/Fantasy
Notable authors published by Tokyo Sogensha include Shirley Jackson, H. P. Lovecraft and Edgar Allan Poe.

Prizes
Tokyo Sogensha awards some prizes for unpublished Japanese works to recruit new writers of specific genres:

  - Started in 1990. An annual contest for mystery fiction, named after Tetsuya Ayukawa, a notable novelist of the genre.
   - Started in 2004. The short story counterpart of the Tetsuya Ayukawa Award, named after the bimonthly magazine the company published. It was the continuation of the Sogen Suiri Prize for New Writers (1994-2003).
  - Since 2010. An annual contest for broad-sense science fiction and speculative fiction short stories.
  - 2014-2020 (5 times). A contest for fantasy novels.

References

External links
  

Book publishing companies in Tokyo
Comic book publishing companies in Tokyo
Publishing companies established in 1948
Japanese companies established in 1948